Josef Winiger (24 January 1855 – 9 August 1929) was a Swiss politician and President of the Swiss Council of States (1910/1911).

External links 
 
 

1855 births
1929 deaths
Members of the Council of States (Switzerland)
Presidents of the Council of States (Switzerland)